Hirayanagi (written: 平栁) is a Japanese surname. Notable people with the surname include:

, Japanese-American filmmaker
, Japanese professional wrestler

Japanese-language surnames